"The 500 Greatest Songs of All Time" is a recurring survey compiled by the American magazine Rolling Stone. It is based on weighted votes from selected musicians, critics, and industry figures. The first list was published in December 2004 in a special issue of the magazine, issue number 963, a year after the magazine published its list of "The 500 Greatest Albums of All Time". In 2010, Rolling Stone published a revised edition, drawing on the original and a later survey of songs released up until the early 2000s.

Another updated edition of the list was published in 2021, with more than half the entries not having appeared on either of the two previous editions; it was based on a new survey and does not factor in the surveys that were conducted for the previous lists. The 2021 list was based on a poll of more than 250 artists, musicians, producers, critics, journalists, and industry figures. They each sent in a ranked list of their top 50 songs, and Rolling Stone tabulated the results.

Top 10 songs 
2004 and 2010 lists

2021 list

Statistics

2004 list
 Of the 500 songs, 351 are from the United States and 120 from the United Kingdom; they are followed by Canada, with 13; Ireland, with 12 entries (of which 8 were composed by U2); Jamaica, with 7; Australia, with two (AC/DC); Sweden (ABBA) and France (Daft Punk), each with one.
 The list includes only songs written in English, with the sole exception of "La Bamba" (number 345), sung in Spanish by the American singer-songwriter Ritchie Valens.
 Few songs written prior to the 1950s are included; some that are listed are Robert Johnson's "Crossroads" (1936), in the version recorded by Cream, and Hank Williams' "I'm So Lonesome I Could Cry" (1949). "The House of the Rising Sun", listed in the version by English rock band the Animals, was recorded at least as early as 1934. Muddy Waters' "Rollin' Stone" (1950) is based on an earlier song, dating to the 1920s.
 There is one instrumental on the list: "Green Onions" by the American band Booker T. and the M.G.'s (number 181).
 The number of songs from each of the decades represented in the 2004 version is as follows:

 
 The Beatles are the most represented musical act, with 23 songs on the list. John Lennon, Paul McCartney and George Harrison are also represented as solo artists. Lennon is the only artist to appear twice in the top 10, as a member of the Beatles and as a solo artist. The Beatles are followed by the Rolling Stones (14); Bob Dylan (13); Elvis Presley (11); U2 (8); the Beach Boys, Jimi Hendrix (7); Led Zeppelin, Prince, Sly and the Family Stone, James Brown, Chuck Berry (6); Elton John, Ray Charles, the Clash, the Drifters, Buddy Holly, and the Who (5).
 The artists not included on the list of the top 100 artists but having the most songs featured in the list are the Animals, Blondie, and the Isley Brothers, each with three songs.
 The album with the most entries on the list (excluding compilation albums) is "Are You Experienced" by the Jimi Hendrix Experience with four songs on the list: "Purple Haze" (number 17), "Foxy Lady" (number 152), "Hey Joe" (number 198) and "The Wind Cries Mary" (number 370).
 Three songs appear on the list twice, performed by different artists: "Mr. Tambourine Man", performed by Bob Dylan (number 107) and by the Byrds (number 79); "Blue Suede Shoes" by Elvis Presley (number 430) and by Carl Perkins (number 95), and "Walk This Way" by Aerosmith (number 346) and by Run-DMC (number 293).
 The shortest tracks are "Rave On!" by Buddy Holly running 1:47, "Great Balls of Fire" by Jerry Lee Lewis (1:52), and Eddie Cochran's "C'mon Everybody" (1:53).
 The longest tracks are "The End" (11:41) by the Doors; "Desolation Row" (11:21) by Bob Dylan, and "Marquee Moon" (9:58) by Television.
 Love is the most frequent word used in the songs' lyrics, with 1,057 occurrences, followed by I'm (1,000), oh (847), know (779), baby (746), got (702), and yeah (656).

2010 list
In May 2010, Rolling Stone compiled an update, published in a special issue and in digital form for the iPod and iPad. The list differs from the 2004 version, with 26 songs added, all of which are songs from the 2000s except "Juicy" by The Notorious B.I.G., released in 1994. The top 25 remained unchanged, but many songs down the list were given different rankings as a result of the inclusion of new songs, causing consecutive shifts among the songs listed in 2004. The highest-ranked new entry was Gnarls Barkley's "Crazy" (number 100).

The number of songs from each decade in the updated version is as follows:

 
 Two songs by U2 and two by Jay-Z were added to the list. Jay-Z is featured in two other new songs on the list: "Crazy in Love" by Beyoncé, and "Umbrella" by Rihanna.
 The only artist to have two songs dropped from the list is the Crystals; their "Da Doo Ron Ron" (previously number 114) was the highest-ranked song to have been dropped.

2021 list

 The most represented musical act is once again the Beatles (12), followed by Bob Dylan, David Bowie, the Rolling Stones (7), Prince (6) and Bruce Springsteen (5).
 The album with the most entries on the list (excluding compilation albums) is Born to Run by Bruce Springsteen with three songs on the list: "Born to Run" (number 27), "Thunder Road" (number 111) and "Jungleland" (number 298).
 The most represented year is 1971 with 21 songs from that year in the Top 500, including 6 in the Top 100.
 Daddy Yankee's "Gasolina" was listed as released in 2010 by mistake, when it was released in 2004.
 "Da Doo Ron Ron" by the Crystals was added back to the list after being removed. The song's new position is at 366.
 The highest entry for a newly added song is "Dreams" by Fleetwood Mac at number 9.
 The highest entry not in the English language is "Gasolina" by Daddy Yankee at number 50.
 30 songs from the 2010s were added, with the highest entry being "Dancing On My Own" by Robyn at number 20.
 The highest entry for a song from 2020 is "Safaera" by Bad Bunny at number 329.
 The highest entry from the previous lists to be excluded is "Hound Dog" by Elvis Presley, originally placed at number 19. The original version by Big Mama Thornton is, however, present at number 318 after being absent from the earlier iterations of the list.
 The longest song on the list is "Walk On By" by Isaac Hayes (12:00) (number 312) and the shortest is "Old Town Road" by Lil Nas X (1:53) (number 490). It is worth noting that the live version of "Whipping Post" by the Allman Brothers Band (number 410) is specifically referenced in the article and is 22:40, almost twice as long as any other song on the list if counted.
 Four songs are featured twice on the list, performed by different artists: "Walk On By" by Dionne Warwick (number 51) and Isaac Hayes (number 312), "Gloria" by Them (number 413) and Patti Smith (number 97), "Mr. Tambourine Man" by Bob Dylan (number 164) and the Byrds (number 230) and "Killing Me Softly with His Song" by Roberta Flack (number 273) and Fugees (number 359).

Artists with multiple songs (2021 edition) 
12 songs
 The Beatles

7 songs

 David Bowie
 Bob Dylan
 The Rolling Stones

6 songs
 Prince

5 songs
 Bruce Springsteen

4 songs

 Beyoncé
 Aretha Franklin
 Marvin Gaye
 Elton John
 Joni Mitchell
 Outkast
 Stevie Wonder

3 songs

 The Beach Boys
 Chuck Berry
 James Brown
 Drake
 Missy Elliott
 Fleetwood Mac
 Jimi Hendrix
 Michael Jackson
 Jay-Z
 The Kinks
 Led Zeppelin
 Madonna
 Bob Marley and the Wailers
 The Notorious B.I.G.
 Dolly Parton
 Elvis Presley
 Radiohead
 R.E.M.
 The Supremes
 U2
 The Who
 Bill Withers
 Neil Young

2 songs

 Fiona Apple
 Bad Bunny
 Black Sabbath
 Blondie
 The Byrds
 Johnny Cash
 Ray Charles
 The Clash
 Leonard Cohen
 Creedence Clearwater Revival
 The Cure
 Dr. Dre
 Eminem
 The Four Tops
 Grateful Dead
 Al Green
 Guns N' Roses
 Buddy Holly
 Whitney Houston
 Lil Wayne
 Little Richard
 Martha and the Vandellas
 Curtis Mayfield
 Metallica
 The Miracles
 New Order
 Nirvana
 N.W.A
 Pink Floyd
 Public Enemy
 Queen
 Ramones
 Otis Redding
 The Revolution
 Rihanna
 Sex Pistols
 Simon & Garfunkel
 Sly and the Family Stone
 Patti Smith
 The Smiths
 Britney Spears
 Taylor Swift
 Talking Heads
 The Temptations
 TLC
 The Velvet Underground
 Kanye West
 Hank Williams

See also
 The Rock and Roll Hall of Fame's selection of 500 Songs that Shaped Rock and Roll
 Rockism and poptimism

References

External links
 "500 Greatest Songs of All Time" by Rolling Stone magazine (updated version of the list)
 

21st century in music
20th century in music
Lists of rated songs
Rolling Stone articles